Auchintaple Loch also known as Auchenchapel Loch, is a small shallow freshwater loch that is located in Glen Isla in Angus, Scotland.

See also
 List of lochs in Scotland

References

Freshwater lochs of Scotland
Lochs of Angus, Scotland
Tay catchment
Birdwatching sites in Scotland